Jamush Olan-e Sofla (also Romanized as Jāmūsh Olan-e Soflá; also known as Gāvmīsh Owlan-e Soflá) is a village in Naqdi Rural District, Meshgin-e Sharqi District, Meshgin Shahr County, Ardabil Province, Iran. At the 2006 census, its population was 67, in 18 families.

References 

Towns and villages in Meshgin Shahr County